Daniel Buchanan (14 April 1880 – 1 December 1950, Vancouver) was a Canadian mathematics and astronomy professor and academic administrator.

Biography
Buchanan received from McMaster University B.A. in 1906, from Hamilton University B.A. in 1906 and M.A. in 1908, and from the University of Chicago Ph.D. in 1911. He was a professor of astronomy and mathematics from 1911 to 1920 at Queen's University, Kingston, Ontario. He was elected in 1921 a Fellow of the Royal Society of Canada. At the University of British Columbia he became in 1920 professor and head of the department of mathematics and astronomy and in 1928 dean of the faculty of arts and sciences.

He was an Invited Speaker of the ICM in 1924 at Toronto and in 1928 at Bologna.

At the University of British Columbia, the Buchanan Building (built from 1956 to 1960) and the Buchanan Tower (built in 1972) are named in his honour.

Selected publications

References

1880 births
1950 deaths
20th-century Canadian mathematicians
Canadian university and college faculty deans
University of Chicago alumni
Academic staff of the University of British Columbia Faculty of Science
Canadian expatriates in the United States